Malcolm O'Connor (born 25 April 1965) is an English former professional footballer who played in the Football League, as a forward.

References

Sources

1965 births
Living people
Footballers from Ashton-under-Lyne
English footballers
Association football forwards
Curzon Ashton F.C. players
Rochdale A.F.C. players
Hyde United F.C. players
Northwich Victoria F.C. players
English Football League players